The Mecelle was the civil code of the Ottoman Empire in the late 19th and early 20th century. It was the first attempt to codify a part of the Sharia-based law of an Islamic state.

Name
The Ottoman Turkish name of the code is Mecelle-ʾi Aḥkām-ı ʿAdlīye, which derives from the Arabic مجلة الأحكام العدلية, Majallah el-Ahkam-i-Adliya.

In European languages, it has also been transliterated as Mejelle, Majalla, Medjelle, or Meğelle. In French, it is known as Medjéllé or as the Code Civil Ottoman.

History

Enactment
The code was prepared by a commission headed by Ahmed Cevdet Pasha, including a large team of scholars, issued in sixteen volumes (containing 1,851 articles) from 1869 to 1876 and entered into force in the year 1877. In its structure and approach it was clearly influenced by the earlier European codifications. Family law, which had been originally exempted and left in the domain of religious courts, eventually became a part of it in 1917, as the Law of Family Rights. It has been praised as the first successful attempt to render Hanafi fiqh into legal civil code comprehensible to the layperson and not just to scholars.

The substance of the code was based on the Hanafi legal tradition that enjoyed official status in the Empire, put into European code-form. However, using the  method of preference (Istihsan), it also incorporated other legal opinions that were considered more appropriate to the time, including from non-Hanafis.

As the Mecelle was eventually applied in the secular (nizamiye) courts as well as in the Sharia courts of the Empire, Jews and Christians were for the first time subjected to Islamic law instead of their own law, but could now be called as witnesses in court.

Post-Ottoman application
After the dissolution of the Ottoman Empire following World War I, the Mecelle remained a lasting influence in most of its successor states (except Egypt, where it was never in force). The Mecelle was long-lasting in most places since it was effective, coherent, and difficult to dislodge. It remained in force:
 in Turkey until 1926, when it was replaced by the Turkish Civil Code
 in Albania until 1928
 in Lebanon until 1932
 in Syria until 1949
 in Iraq until 1953
 in Cyprus until the 1960s
 in the British Mandate for Palestine and, later, Israel formally until 1984, although individual laws had gradually superseded it during the Mandate as well as in the 1960s and '70s

In Bosnia and Herzegovina after 1878 Austro - Hungarian occupation, Mecelle was slowly replaced with General Civil Code, but some provisions of Mecelle remain in force even after 1918, until abolishment of state Sharia courts in 1946.

The Mecelle also remained the basis of civil law in Jordan and Kuwait.

Overview

Book 1: Sale 
The first book of the Mecelle is composed of seven chapters that focus on the jurisprudence and codification of laws regarding sale. These include standards of contracts, the subject matter of sales, matters relating to price, giving and taking delivery, and various categories of things sold and the effect thereof.

Book 2: Hire 
Book 2 is the legal codification of circumstances dealing with hire (renting). This book contains general hire specifications, questions relating to the contract of hire, questions relating to the amount of the hire, period of the hire, type of thing hired and matters relating thereto, rights and obligations of person giving and person taking on hire after the conclusion of contract, and matters of compensation.

Book 3: Guarantee 
Book 3 deals with legal guarantee. This includes matters of contractual agreement and release from a contract of guarantee.

Book 4: Transfer of Debt 
This book includes matters of contracts dealing in transfer of debts.

Book 5: Pledges 
A pledge consists of setting aside property from which it is possible to obtain payment or satisfaction of some claim. Such property is then said to be pledged, or given in pledge.
Book 5 includes the fundamental basis of the contract of the pledge, stipulations of the pledgor and pledgee, fundamental rules relating to the pledge, and sale of the pledge.

Book 6: Trust and Trusteeship 
This book contains all legal information regarding trusts and trusteeship. A trust involves something that is entrusted to one person from another person for safe keeping. Trusts can also involve the loaning of something for use, meaning that the one accepting the loan is to enjoy use in the subject of the trust. This section includes general conditions of trusteeship, as well as stipulations for depositing for safe keeping and loaning for use

Book 7: Gift 
A gift consists of bestowing the ownership of property upon some other person without receiving anything in return. This section consists of two chapters that outline matters relating to the contract of gift and fundamental rules relating to gift, such as guidelines for the revocation of a gift.

Book 8: Wrongful Appropriation and Destruction 
Wrongful appropriation is when a person takes and keeps another person's property without the owner's consent. This book is composed of law regarding wrongful appropriation and destruction of one's property by another. This book also defines direct and indirect destruction of property and the legal ramifications associated with each type of property destruction.

Book 9: Interdiction, Constraint and Pre-emption 
In this book, interdiction, constraint, and pre-emption are legally codified where interdiction consists of prohibiting any particular person from dealing with his own property; Constraint consists of wrongfully forcing a person through fear to do something without his consent. Pre-emption consists of acquiring possession of property which has been purchased, by paying the purchaser what he paid for it. This book defines matters relating to the interdiction of minors, lunatics, and imbeciles, as well as prodigals and debtors. In regards to pre-emption, this book includes conditions attaching to the right of pre-emption, the claim of pre-emption, and the effect of pre-emption.

Book 10: Joint Ownership 
This book is composed of law regarding joint ownership, in which a thing belongs absolutely to more than one individual. In this book, there is a distinction made between two classes of joint ownership. The first class is when joint ownership arises due to purchase or gift. The second class is when joint ownership comes about through contract and agreement of parties in the joint ownership. This book is composed of eight chapters including legal code on partition, walls and neighbors, jointly owned property which is free, joint expenses, and partnership.

Book 11: Agency 
Book 11 is based on agency, which consists of one person empowering another person to perform some act for him. This book is composed of three chapters regarding the fundamental basis and classification of agency, conditions attaching to agency, and essential elements of agency.

Book 12: Settlement and Release 
This book divides settlement into three parts and release into two parts. 
Settlement: The first part consists of a settlement by admission of the defendant. The second part consists of a settlement by denial of the defendant. The third part consists of a settlement by the silence of the defendant consequent upon the absence of any admission or denial. 
Release: The first part consists of release by way of renunciation of a right. The second consists of release by admission of payment. 
This book includes chapters dealing with conclusion of a contract of settlement and release, the consideration and subject matter of the settlement, the subject matter of the settlement, and fundamental conditions governing settlement and release.

Book 13: Admissions 
This book is composed of law regarding conditions governing admissions, the validity of an admission, the effect of an admission, and written admissions.

Book 14: Actions 
This book is based on actions, where an action is a claim against a person made by another person in court. This book includes conditions and fundamental rules relating to an action and the defense, as well as limitations to actions.

Book 15: Evidence and Administration of an Oath 
This book is composed of four  chapters that include law on the nature of evidence, documentary evidence and presumptive evidence, administering an oath, and preferred evidence and administration of an oath to both parties.

Book 16: Administration of Justice by the Courts 
This final book of the Mecelle is based on the legal administration of justice including codification of judges, judgement, retrial, and arbitration.

Translations

The French version of the Mecelle is available in Législation ottomane, ou Recueil des lois, règlements, ordonnances, traités, capitulations et autres documents officiels de l´Empire ottoman, a collection of Ottoman law edited by Demetrius Nicolaides and published by Gregory Aristarchis. Mecelle is in volumes 6-7, which do not include Aristarchis's name. According to Johann Strauss, author of "A Constitution for a Multilingual Empire," these two volumes "seem to have been edited solely by Demetrius Nicolaides". G. Sinapian, a scholar of Turkish studies and a jurist of Armenian descent, translated the eight chapters of the Mecelle in volume 7. For Livre des Preuves he used work by Ohannes Bey Alexanian as a basis. L. Rota, a lawyer of Constantinople (now Istanbul), translated other parts, assisted by Alexander Adamides.

A Greek version, Nomikoi kanones ētoi Astykos Kōdēx (Νομικοί κανόνες ήτοι Αστυκός Κώδηξ), was translated by Konstantinos Photiadis, and Ioannis Vithynos, and was released from 1873 to 1881. Both men were well-versed in Ottoman Turkish. Johann Strauss, author of "A Constitution for a Multilingual Empire: Translations of the Kanun-ı Esasi and Other Official Texts into Minority Languages", wrote that "The translation [...] was a demanding task" which "required abundant notes." Nicolaides also made his own Greek translation; the Sultan of the Ottoman Empire Abdulhamid II gave Nicolaides, through the Ottoman Internal Affairs fund, 5,000 piastres due to the translations of the legal documents.

Nicolaides also wrote a document stating that he translated volumes of the Mecelle and the Düstur into Bulgarian. He lacked funds to publish the entire collection; vilayet council leaders agreed to fund the distribution of these volumes. He had translated two volumes which together had half of the Düstur and Mecelle laws at the time.

Notes

References
  - Volume 12 of Bamberger Orientstudien
 
  (info page on book at Martin Luther University)
 Encyclopedia of World History, 6th. ed., online at bartleby.com, accessed January 2007

External links

 AL-MAJALLA English translation - International Islamic University Malaysia
 
 Aristarchi, Gregoire (Bey) (1873, 1874, 1878, 1881) Legislation ottomane, : ou Recueil des lois, reglements, ordonnances, traités, capitulations et autres documents officiels de l'Émpire Ottoman. Constantinople: Imprimerie, Frères Nicolaides (in French)
 National Library of France (BnF) Gallica: Volumes 6 and 7
 Also at University of Crete - Has downloadable PDF files
 Also at HeinOnline
 Copies of the Mecelle in Greek - University of Crete
Ottoman law
Civil codes
Turkish words and phrases